The Gombe State House of Assembly is the legislative arm of the government of Gombe State of Nigeria. It is a unicameral legislature with 24 members elected from the 11 local government areas of the state delineated into 24 state constituencies. Local government areas with considerably larger populations are delineated into two constituencies to give equal representation. This makes the number of legislators in the Gombe State House of Assembly 24.

The fundamental functions of the Assembly are to enact new laws, amend or repeal existing laws and oversight of the executive. Members of the assembly are elected for a term of four years concurrent with federal legislators (Senate and House of Representatives). The state assembly convenes three times a week (Tuesdays, Wednesdays and Thursdays) in the assembly complex within the state capital, Gombe.

The leaders of the 6th Gombe State House of Assembly are Mr Luggerewo , Speaker (APC,Akko Central constituency), Siddi Buba, Deputy Speaker, (APC, Kwami West Constituency),  Yerima Gaule, Majority Leader   The All Progressives Congress (APC) is the majority party with 19 seats while People's Democratic Party (PDP) constitutes the minority position having only 5 seats.

Gombe State House Of Assembly Constituencies List: 

 Akko Central
 Akko North
 Akko West
 Balanga North
 Balanga South
 Billiri East
 Billiri West
 Dukku North
 Dukku South
 Deba
 Funakaye North
 Funakaye South
 Gombe North
 Gombe South
 Kaltungo East
 Kaltungo West
 Kwami East
 Kwami West
 Nafada North
 Nafada South
 Pero/Chonge
 Shongom
 Yamaltu East
 Yamaltu West

References

Politics of Gombe State
State legislatures of Nigeria